Gelan is a district in the south of Ghazni province, Afghanistan. Its population was estimated at 78,408 in 2002. The district capital is Janda.

The district is within the heartland of the Tarakai tribe of Ghilji Pashtuns.

Politics and Governance

Geography

Healthcare

Education

Demographics

Infrastructure

Natural Resources

References

External links

 Map of Settlements AIMS, May 2002

Districts of Ghazni Province